Wouter Mol (born 17 April 1982 in Nibbixwoud) is a Dutch former professional road racing cyclist, who rode professionally between 2004 and 2016.

2012 Tour Down Under
One tradition of the Tour Down Under is that the fans choose an unknown rider and treat him the way they would a star, by mobbing him at hotels and painting his name on the road. The rider must be a non-English speaking domestique who most likely will not get a start at a major race and will simply act as a bottle carrier. For 2012,  rider Mol was chosen.

Major results

2006
 3rd Ronde van Drenthe
 5th Nokere Koerse
 7th Nationale Sluitingsprijs
2007
 1st Grote 1-MeiPrijs
 4th GP de Dourges-Hénin-Beaumont
 6th Omloop van het Houtland
 7th Ronde van Overijssel
2008
 1st Grote Prijs Jef Scherens
 3rd Drie Zustersteden
 8th Nationale Sluitingsprijs
2009
 2nd Münsterland Giro
 3rd Hel van het Mergelland
 10th Ronde van het Groene Hart
2010
 1st  Overall Tour of Qatar
 3rd Profronde van Fryslan
 6th GP Herning
 7th Dwars door Vlaanderen
 9th Arno Wallaard Memorial
2011
 9th Grote Prijs Stad Zottegem
2012
 10th Classic Loire Atlantique
2013
 3rd Grote Prijs Stad Zottegem
 6th Overall World Ports Classic
 10th Kampioenschap van Vlaanderen
2014
 3rd GP Maurice Raes
 6th Omloop der Kempen
2015
 2nd Arno Wallaard Memorial
 3rd Ronde van Limburg
 7th Arnhem–Veenendaal Classic
 8th Grote Prijs Stad Zottegem
 9th Ronde van Drenthe
2016
 1st Stage 5 Rás Tailteann
 3rd Ronde van Noord-Holland
 4th Slag om Norg
 9th Grote Prijs Stad Zottegem
 10th De Kustpijl

References

External links

 

1982 births
Living people
Dutch male cyclists
People from Noorder-Koggenland
Cyclists from North Holland
21st-century Dutch people